Ernest Peter Smith (October 28, 1907 – February 25, 1975) was a Native American artist from the Tonawanda Seneca Nation.  Smith painted mostly traditional Seneca myths and stories of daily life in the Seneca village he grew up in. In the 1930s Smith produced a large series of paintings documenting Seneca life, as part of the WPA Indian Art Project.

Early life and career 
Ernest Smith was born and raised on the Tonawanda Reservation, a son of Louisa (née Sundown) and Peter S. Smith. He was the youngest of seven children and a member of the Heron Clan.  In his childhood, Smith began to teach himself how to draw and paint, but he left school before he could graduate to help support his family. 

Smith first became known as an artist when anthropologist Arthur C. Parker hired him to be a part of the WPA Indian Arts Project around 1935, which was sponsored by the Rochester Municipal Museum. He joined Jesse Cornplanter and Samford Plummer as the most prolific Haudenosaunee artists who were a part of this anthropological project. As part of the project, Smith created a mural at the Rochester Museum and Science Center.

Collections
National Museum of the American Indian
Rochester Museum and Science Center
National Anthropological Archives of the Smithsonian Institution

References 

1907 births
1975 deaths
Artists from New York (state)
Works Progress Administration in New York (state)
20th-century indigenous people of the Americas
20th-century American artists
Native American painters